Abeuk  is a village in Ann Township in the Rakhine State of western Burma. It is located approximately 120 kilometres east of Sittwe.  It lies in the Arakan Roma mountain range.

References

Populated places in Kyaukpyu District
Ann Township